Stephen Earl Nichols (born February 19, 1951) is an American actor, recognized for his roles on American daytime soap operas. He has portrayed Steve "Patch" Johnson on NBC's Days of Our Lives on and off since 1985. In 1996, he joined the cast of ABC's General Hospital as Stefan Cassadine; he exited the role in 2003. From 2009 to 2013, he portrayed the role of Tucker McCall on The Young and the Restless.

Career
After turning down an art scholarship to Ohio State University, he traveled west, studied yoga and lived as a monk while preparing vegetarian meals for the monks and nuns in a Hollywood ashram.

After three years of celibacy, a steady diet of ice cream and the films of Truffaut and Bergman, he landed at the Theater Academy of Los Angeles City College where he studied for two years. Nichols went on to study with Stella Adler, Jack Colvin and Harry Mastrorgeorge.
 
For his stage work, Nichols has been honored with three Drama-Logue Awards and two LA Weekly Theater Awards for his performances in such notable productions as Pieces of Time (for his portrayal of real-life killer, Donald Bashor), for Delirious (directed by Ron Link), and as Jim Morrison in the last thirty-six hours of his life in The Lizard King. Nichols also appeared at LATC in Rick Clutchey's The Cage, in the award-winning production of Michael Cristofer's The Shadow Box at Theater East and Love Letters, during its initial run at the Canon Theater.

Most recently, Nichols appeared in He Hunts at the Geffen Playhouse and was seen in the U.S. première of Joe Pintaro's The Dead Boy, for which Nichols received a Maddy Award.

Days of Our Lives
His original portrayal of Steve "Patch" Johnson (1985–90) earned him an Emmy nomination for Outstanding Actor in a Leading Role and five Soap Opera Digest Best Actor Awards. Steve and Kayla (Mary Beth Evans) remain one of the most popular couples, and the most-covered, on Days of our Lives ever. Nichols talked about one of their favorite storylines and shared, “Mary Beth likes Emily and Gideon. It was a fantasy, it wasn’t really us, but we were reading this beautiful diary, in the old mansion, and then it would flash to the characters.” 

Nichols returned to the role of Steve (Patch) Johnson on Days of Our Lives in 2006, and played the role until 2009.

On April 17, 2015, it was reported that Nichols would return as reprise the role of Steve "Patch" Johnson of NBC's Days of Our Lives and Nichols second return air date on September 15. He continues to play the role as of December 2020.

From December 2019-January 2020, Nichols played the role of Stefano DiMera as part of a storyline where Dr. Wilhelm Rolf implanted a chip into Steve Johnson's brain that turned him into "the new Stefano DiMera".

Other work
Nichols also portrayed Stefan Cassadine on the soap General Hospital (1996–2003). This role reunited him with Evans, while his character was later paired with Laura Spencer, played by Genie Francis.

Other TV appearances have included Matlock, L.A. Law, Diagnosis: Murder, The Nanny (with former Days of our Lives co-star Charles Shaughnessy), Second Chances, Sisters, a recurring role on Empty Nest, and playing Jesse James opposite Pierce Brosnan in the NBC mini-series Around the World in 80 Days.

Nichols has appeared in several feature films, first co-starring with Demi Moore in Choices. He was also in Witchboard; Soapdish with Kevin Kline, Whoopi Goldberg and Robert Downey, Jr.; Heaven's Tears; Cover Me with Paul Sorvino; Phoenix with Brad Dourif and William Sanderson; and the Showtime short A Hard Rain with John Mahoney, which earned best film honors at the British Film Festival for director Dennie Gordon.

Nichols has directed several stage productions, including Sixty Minutes from L.A., a presentation pilot for television, Wild Horses (co-director) and most recently, wrote and directed the dramatic short film Get the Dime starring Daniel Bess and Robert Picardo. Get the Dime was a director's pick at the Palm Springs International Festival of Short Films. Upcoming, Nichols will direct the feature films Eau de L.A. and Fear of Falling.

On December 17, 2009, it was reported on stephennichols.net and cbs.com that he had joined the cast of CBS's The Young and the Restless as Tucker McCall, replacing William Russ. Nichols's first air date was January 27, 2010. On Y&R, he would later be reunited with General Hospital counterpart Genie Francis, who played Genevieve Atkinson on the show. Nichols's last day on Y&R was January 29, 2013.

Personal life
Stephen Nichols has three children: Vanessa, Aaron, and Dylan. Nichols married Lisa Gordon in 1984. All three children have had small parts on Days of Our Lives. Nichols’ son, Aaron, played young Steve Johnson. Nichols’ daughter, Dylan, has a burgeoning music career. Nichols has two grandchildren.

Filmography

Film

Television

See also
Supercouple

References

External links
 The official website for Stephen Nichols' fans
 Stephen Nichols' Instagram
 

1951 births
American male film actors
American male soap opera actors
American male television actors
Living people
Male actors from Cincinnati
20th-century American male actors
21st-century American male actors